Nova Sintra is a city in the central part of the island of Brava in southwestern Cape Verde. It serves as the seat of the Brava Municipality. The settlement is named after Sintra, the summer residence of the Portuguese kings. Its population is about 1,500. Its elevation is around 500 meters. Since 2010, Nova Sintra has been a city. Agriculture is the predominant source of income on Brava. Tourism is less developed, but there are a few small hotels and guest houses.  The "aluguer" buses to the other villages start from Praça Eugénio Tavares.

The historic center has been submitted to the tentative list of UNESCO's World Heritage Sites in 2016.

Geography
Nearby places include the port of Furna to the northeast, Santa Bárbara and Vinagre to the east, João da Noly to the south and Nossa Senhora do Monte to the southwest.

Sights 
 Nova Sintra's popular fame is Eugénio Tavares, a famous Cape Verdean writer. There is a monument of him beside the house where he lived, which is museum today.
 The square Praça Eugénio Tavares is the center of town. There is a well-kept park, a music pavilion, a post office, a bank, a pharmacy and the City Hall. The Protestant church Igreja do Nazareno is the oldest church of the island. Opposite the bank one of the rare dragon trees (Dracaena draco) can be seen.
 The Catholic Church of Saint John the Baptist (São João Baptista) was built around 1880.
 There is also a New Apostolic Church, an Adventist Church, a Kingdom Hall of Jehova's Witnesses and a branch of the Church of Jesus Christ of Latter Day Saints in Nova Sintra.
Rua da Cultura is a historic street in the center of the town. Well-preserved colonial architecture can be seen here.
In the Eastern part of the town there is a sightworthy monument and viewpoint shaped like a ship. The name "Santa Maria" which is painted on the ship refers to the ship of Christopher Columbus. From here there is a beautiful view over the village of Santa Bárbara to the East coast of Brava and the harbour of Furna. There are similar monuments in other villages as well, e.g. in Campo Baixo in the South of Brava.

Historical population

Climate
Nova Sintra has a desert climate and is cooler than the low-lying areas of the island.

International relations
Nova Sintra is twinned with:
 Sintra, Portugal

References

Cities in Cape Verde
Municipal seats in Cape Verde
Geography of Brava, Cape Verde